Elections to Shetland Islands Council were held on 3 May 2007 the same day as the other Scottish local government elections and the Scottish Parliament general election. The election was the first one using seven new wards created as a result of the Local Governance (Scotland) Act 2004.  Each ward elected three or four councillors using the single transferable vote system, a form of proportional representation. The new wards replaced 22 single-member wards which used the plurality (first past the post) system of election. The council was one of only three in Scotland with a majority of elected members who were independents.

Election results

Ward results

North Isles

Shetland North

Shetland West

Shetland West

Shetland South

Lerwick North

Lerwick South

By-elections since 2007 Elections
On 28 February 2008 Independent Dr Jonathan Wills won a by-election which arose following the death of Independent Councillor Cecil Eunson on 25 December 2007.

On 15 December 2011 Independent David Sandison won a by-election which arose following the resignation of Independent Councillor Iris Hawkins on 30 September 2011.

References

2007
2007 Scottish local elections
21st century in Shetland